Frantz Fanon, une vie, un combat, une œuvre is a 2001 documentary film.

Synopsis 
This movie depicts Frantz Fanon's life. A psychiatrist from Martinique, he became a spokesman for the anti-colonialist struggle. In 1952, Frantz Fanon wrote Black Skin, White Masks, an analysis of racism and the ways in which its victims internalize it. In the 50s, he aided the rebels of the Algerian anti-colonial war. Expelled from Algeria in 1956, he moved to Tunis, Tunisia, where he wrote for the rebel newspaper El Moudjahid, founded one of Africa's first psychiatric clinics and wrote several books on decolonization. He died from leukemia in Washington, D.C., at the age of 36.

External links 

2001 films
Creative Commons-licensed documentary films
Algerian documentary films
French documentary films
Tunisian documentary films
2001 documentary films
Frantz Fanon
Documentary films about writers
Documentary films about revolutionaries
Documentary films about African resistance to colonialism
2000s French films